Goodbye Naples (Italian: Addio, Napoli!) is a 1955 Italian melodrama film directed by Roberto Bianchi Montero and starring Tamara Lees, Andrea Checchi and Giorgio De Lullo.

The film's sets were designed by the art director Ivo Battelli and Alfredo Montori.

Cast
 Tamara Lees as Irene 
 Andrea Checchi as Frank 
 Giorgio De Lullo a sTom 
 Leopoldo Valentini as Carmine 
 Maria Grazia Francia as Clara 
 Virna Lisi: Clara's friend (uncredited)
 Charles Fawcett as Charles Burton 
 Dante Maggio as Pasquale 
 Anna Pretolani as Nunziata 
 Antonio Corevi as Gaetano Fortunati 
 Nino Vingelli as Pasqualino De Rosa 
 Domenico Maggio as Giulio Lombardo 
 Pasquale Martino as The Priest 
 Vittoria Paoletti as Clara's daughter

References

Bibliography 
 Chiti, Roberto & Poppi, Roberto. Dizionario del cinema italiano: Dal 1945 al 1959. Gremese Editore, 1991.

External links 
 

1955 films
Italian drama films
1955 drama films
1950s Italian-language films
Films directed by Roberto Bianchi Montero
Melodrama films
Italian black-and-white films
1950s Italian films